Research in Social Stratification and Mobility is an annual peer-reviewed academic journal covering research on social stratification and inequality. It was established in 1981 and is published by Elsevier on behalf of the International Sociological Association's Research Committee 28 (abbreviated RC28) on Social Stratification and Mobility, of which it is the official journal. The editor-in-chief is Meir Yaish (University of Haifa). According to the Journal Citation Reports, the journal has a 2016 impact factor of 1.033.

References

External links

Sociology journals
Social inequality
Publications established in 1981
English-language journals
Elsevier academic journals
Annual journals